Cymindis angularis is a species of ground beetle in the subfamily Harpalinae. It was described by Gyllenhal in 1810.

References

angularis
Beetles described in 1810